Thahanam Gaha (Forbidden Tree) is a 2002 Sri Lankan Sinhala political thriller film directed by Christy Shelton Fernando and produced by W. Ranjith Perera for Winson Films. It stars Anoja Weerasinghe, Cyril Wickramage and Dilhani Ekanayake in lead roles along with Asoka Peiris and Shashi Wijendra. Music composed by Nadeeka Guruge. It is the 1165th Sri Lankan film in the Sinhala cinema.

Plot

Cast
 Anoja Weerasinghe as Seetha, Nirmala's mother
 Asoka Peiris as Roland Wijewardena
 Sunethra Sarachchandra as Helen
 Cyril Wickramage
 Dilhani Ekanayake as Nirmala
 Shashi Wijendra as Wasantha
 Razi Anwar
 Indrajith Navinna
 Richard Weerakody
 Bandula Suriyabandara
 Sarath Silva

Soundtrack

References

2007 films
2000s Sinhala-language films